Opera a la Carte is a UK-based chamber opera company located in London.  It was founded in 1993 by its present General Director, Nicholas Heath, who was a member of the chorus of the Royal Opera from 1993 to 2006.

Since 1996, its wide range of operas performed runs from La traviata to the 2011 season Rigoletto taking in the popular Mozart operas such as Don Giovanni and The Marriage of Figaro and those of Puccini, such as Tosca and La boheme.

There are more thrills and spills in a terrific, tiny- budget “Tosca” from Opera a la Carte..... Nicholas Heath’s lusty production shows that the greater the risk, the greater the rewards. [Bloomberg News]

See also
 List of opera companies in Europe

External links
UK company's website
Review of UK company's Magic Flute

Musical groups established in 1993
Theatre production companies
British opera companies
Opera in London
1993 establishments in England